Monteleone Sabino is a  (municipality) in the Province of Rieti in the Latium region of Italy, located about  northeast of Rome and about  south of Rieti.

Main sights
 Trebula Mutusca: ruins of the ancient Sabine town
 Santa Vittoria: 12th-century Romanesque shrine or sanctuary church, which left side was rebuilt during the 15th century.

Twin towns
 Santa Vittoria in Matenano, Italy

References

External links
Official website.
 

Cities and towns in Lazio